Edmund Walter Perera Seneviratne Jayawardena, QC (6 March 1910 - 19??) was a Sri Lankan lawyer and diplomat. He was the 24th Solicitor General of Ceylon and Sri Lankan Ambassador to the Soviet Union.

Having graduated with a BA degree from the University of London, Jayawardena was called to the bar in 1941 as an Barrister from the Lincoln's Inn. Returning to Ceylon, he started his legal practice in the unofficial bar, yet served as an acting/additional crown counsel at times between 1942 to 1944. In January 1947, he was he was appointed crown counsel in the Attorney General's Department. From October 1947 to August 1950 he  served in the Ceylon's High Commission to the United Kingdom first as Secretary to the Ceylon Government Representatives in London, Third Secretary and acting Second Secretary. On his return he returned to service as a crown counsel. In 1953 he was promoted to senior crown counsel. In 1967 he was appointed Solicitor General of Ceylon, succeeding Victor Tennekoon, and held the office until 1968. He was succeeded by L. B. T. Premaratne.

He returned to unofficial bar and served as Sri Lankan Ambassador to the Soviet Union and Yugoslavia from 1977 to 1978. He was married to Marie Muller, daughter of Dr. W.M. Muller, they had one son David Jayawardena.

References

1914 births
Year of death missing
Ambassadors of Sri Lanka to the Soviet Union
J
Ceylonese Queen's Counsel
Sinhalese lawyers
Sri Lankan barristers
Sri Lankan diplomats
Alumni of the University of London
Members of Lincoln's Inn